Rest Haven is an unincorporated community and census-designated place (CDP) in Will County, Illinois, United States. It is bordered to the east by Ritchie and to the south, across the Kankakee, by Custer Park.

Rest Haven was first listed as a CDP prior to the 2020 census.

Demographics

References 

Census-designated places in Will County, Illinois
Census-designated places in Illinois